Smögens IF is a Swedish football club located in Smögen.

External links
 Smögens IF – Official site 

Football clubs in Västra Götaland County